Pink Cloud is the fourth extended play by electronic duo Pegboard Nerds. Pink Cloud was released on 21 October 2015, by independent electronic music label Monstercat to help fund breast cancer research.

Background and composition
Odden and Parsberg announced Pink Cloud, stating "We are excited to share this new project with the world. It's a new sound we've been working on for the past couple months, but more importantly, we are on a mission to change lives with our music. We invite you to take a step into our world, Nerd Nation".

Reception and release 
Pink Cloud was released on 21 October 2015, to raise money for Breast Cancer research and to raise awareness under the Fuck Cancer initiative. Pink Cloud peaked at No. 2 on the iTunes Dance charts and became widely successful, raising over $20,000 for the cause. Odden & Parsberg stated "Every dollar generated from our Pink Cloud EP, merchandise, and other campaign initiatives will go directly towards funding prevention, early detection and supporting those affected by cancer". The EP contains 5 original songs and a VIP of their 2012 song Fire in the Hole.

Pink Cloud (The Remixes) 
A remix album was released on 20 January 2016. The album includes 21 remixes from various artists including Morgan Page, Terravita and Two Friends.

Track listing

Pink Cloud

Pink Cloud (The Remixes)

Charts

References

Electronic EPs
Pegboard Nerds albums
Monstercat EPs